Acanthotrema is a genus of trematodes in the family Heterophyidae.

Species
Acanthotrema armatum Lafuente, Roca & Carbonell, 2000
Acanthotrema cursitans (Holliman, 1961) [emend. Kinsella & Heard, 1973] Sohn, Han & Chai, 2003
Acanthotrema felis Sohn, Han & Chai, 2003
Acanthotrema hancocki (Martin, 1950) Lafuente, Roca & Carbonell, 2000
Acanthotrema martini (Sogandares-Bernal, 1959) Lafuente, Roca & Carbonell, 2000
Acanthotrema tanayense (Velasquez, 1973) Sohn, Han & Chai, 2003
Acanthotrema tridactyla (Martin & Kuntz, 1955) Sohn, Han & Chai, 2003

References

Heterophyidae
Plagiorchiida genera